Broadside or broadsides may refer to:

Naval 

 Broadside (naval), terminology for the side of a ship, the battery of cannon on one side of a warship, or their near simultaneous fire on naval warfare

Printing and literature
 Broadside (comic strip), a weekly cartoon for United States Navy personnel
 Broadside (magazine), a folk music magazine
 Broadside (music), a poster with the lyrics to a folk song on it
 Broadside (newspaper), the student newspaper of George Mason University
 Broadside (printing), any large piece of paper printed on one side not folded
 Broadside ballad, a tabloid type of street literature popular from 1500 to 1850
 Dunlap broadside, a first printing of the United States Declaration of Independence
 Broadside, the student literary arts journal of Bradley University
 Broadsides: New Irish & English Songs, a 1937 poetry collection edited by W. B. Yeats and Dorothy Wellesley, Duchess of Wellington
 Broadside Books, an American imprint of HarperCollins

Other uses
 Broadside (auto collision), a type of vehicle crash where the side of one or more vehicles is impacted.
 Broadside (album) a studio album by the 11-piece folk band Bellowhead, released 2012
 Broadside (band), a five piece pop punk band from Richmond, Virginia, USA
 Broadside (TV series), an American television series that aired during 1964-1965
 Broadsides (video game), a 1983 'Age of Sail' naval combat video game  
 Adnams Broadside, a beer by Adnams Brewery
 Broadside (antenna engineering), a type of radiation pattern for a linear array antenna where the axis of the main lobe is perpendicular to the axis of the array.